Michaëlla Krajicek and Karolína Plíšková were the defending champions, but chose not to participate this year.
Chan Hao-ching and Anabel Medina Garrigues won the title, defeating Lara Arruabarrena and Raluca Olaru in the final, 6–4, 7–6(7–5).

Seeds

Draw

References
 Main Draw

Nurnberger Versicherungscup Doubles
2015 Doubles
Nurnberger Versicherungscup Doubles